Acanthetaxalus is a genus of beetle in the family Cerambycidae. Its only species is Acanthetaxalus bostrychoides. It was described by Stephan von Breuning in 1961.

References

Pteropliini
Beetles described in 1961